Atri is a Vedic sage credited with composing hymns to Hindu deities.

Atri or Attri may also refer to:

Places
 Atri, Abruzzo, a comune in Teramo, Italy
 Atri Cathedral
 Roman Catholic Diocese of Atri
 Atri (hot spring), a village and hot spring in Odisha, India
 Atri Assembly constituency, an electoral constituency of the Bihar Legislative Assembly, India

People
 Atri Kar, first Indian transgender person to take part in a civil services exam
 Akbar Atri, Iranian democracy and human rights activist
 G. V. Atri (1964-2000), Indian Kannada-language singer
 Reza Atri (born 1994), Iranian freestyle wrestler
 Vikram Atri (born 1983), English cricketer
 Manu Attri (born 1992), Indian badminton player
 Vishva Nath Attri, Indian economist and academic

Other uses
 Atri: My Dear Moments, a 2020 visual novel

See also
 Atria (disambiguation)
 Atris (disambiguation)